The men's javelin throw event at the 2017 European Athletics U23 Championships was held in Bydgoszcz, Poland, at Zdzisław Krzyszkowiak Stadium on the 13th and 15th of July.

Medalists

Results

Qualification
13 July

Qualification rule: 74.00 (Q) or the 12 best results (q) qualified for the final.

Final
15 July

References

Javelin throw
Javelin throw at the European Athletics U23 Championships